Heawood is a surname. Notable people with the surname include:

Jonathan Heawood, British journalist
Percy John Heawood (1861–1955), British mathematician
Heawood conjecture
Heawood graph
Heawood number

See also
Heywood (surname)